Lyminge was a station on the Elham Valley Railway. It opened in 1887 and finally closed to passengers and freight in 1947.

History
A 21-lever signal box was provided. Initially, there were six passenger trains per day. By 1906 there were nine trains a day, with five on Sunday. The service had been reduced to eight trains a day by 1922. The line north of Lyminge was reduced to five trains a day by 1937. The double track north of Lyminge was reduced to single track from 25 October 1931. The signal box was closed on 1 May 1937 as a cost-cutting measure. It was replaced by a ground frame located in the station building.

Passenger services to Folkestone continued until withdrawn on 3 May 1943. The station remained open to freight during the war. Military control was relinquished on 19 February 1945. On 7 October 1946, passenger services were reinstated on the southern section of the railway as far as Lyminge. Six trains a day were operated. This service ceased on 14 June 1947. The Elham Valley Railway closed on 1 October 1947. After closure, the goods yard used by the local coal merchant. In 1987, the station building was converted to serve as Lyminge's library.

References 
citations

Sources
 

Disused railway stations in Kent
Former South Eastern Railway (UK) stations
Railway stations in Great Britain opened in 1887
Railway stations in Great Britain closed in 1943
Railway stations in Great Britain opened in 1946
Railway stations in Great Britain closed in 1947
1887 establishments in England
1947 disestablishments in England